Battleship is a 2012 American military science fiction action film based on the board game of the same name. The film was directed by Peter Berg from a script by brothers Jon and Erich Hoeber and stars Alexander Skarsgård, Taylor Kitsch, Brooklyn Decker, Rihanna, Tadanobu Asano, Hamish Linklater and Liam Neeson. In the film, the crews of a small group of warships are forced to battle against a naval fleet of extraterrestrial origin in order to thwart their destructive goals.

Battleship premiered in Tokyo on April 3, 2012 and was released by Universal Pictures in the United States on May 18, 2012. The film was a box-office bomb, grossing $303 million worldwide against a production budget of $209–220 million, losing both Universal and Hasbro $150 million. It was nominated for six awards at the 33rd Golden Raspberry Awards, including Worst Picture, winning one for Worst Supporting Actress for Rihanna.

Plot
In 2005, potentially habitable "Planet G" is discovered, and in 2006, a communications array to reach any extraterrestrial life is built in Oahu. There, Alex Hopper is arrested while attempting to impress Sam Shane, daughter of Admiral Terrance Shane. Alex’s brother, Commander Stone Hopper, forces Alex to join the U.S. Navy.

During the 2012 RIMPAC exercise, five alien spacecraft arrive. Their communications ship hits a satellite and crashes through the Bank of China Tower in Hong Kong, while the others plunge into the waters off Hawaii. Sampson, John Paul Jones, and Japanese destroyer JDS  discover a floating structure that generates a force shield isolating the Hawaiian Islands and the three destroyers from the rest of the world, and jamming all radar and communications inside. Three alien warships surface and open fire; Myōkō is destroyed, Sampson is lost with all hands including Stone, and John Paul Jones’ command crew are killed, with Alex reluctantly assuming command. John Paul Jones disengages to recover Myōkō’s survivors, including Captain Yugi Nagata, while alien drones destroy Oahu’s military installations and roads, ignoring all targets that do not pose a threat.

Hiking near the communications array, Sam and retired U.S. Army lieutenant colonel and double amputee Mick Canales discover the aliens' presence. They encounter scientist Cal Zapata, realizing the aliens have taken over the array to re-establish communications with their home planet. John Paul Jones’ crew captures an alien which telepathically links with Alex, revealing their history of destroying worlds. Other aliens retrieve their comrade while another sabotages the ship. Its armored suit proves impervious to small-arms fire but is obliterated by the destroyer’s 5-inch gun, and the captured alien's helmet reveals their eyes are sensitive to sunlight. Ashore, Sam, Mick, and Zapata recover his spectrum analyzer, using it to radio John Paul Jones that the aliens will contact their planet when the facility’s satellite is in position in four hours.

As night falls, Captain Nagata suggests using the National Oceanic and Atmospheric Administration tsunami warning buoys around Hawaii to track the warships without radar, allowing John Paul Jones to destroy two of them. The third proves too elusive, so they lure it into facing east as the sun rises. Alex and Nagata shoot out its bridge windows, blinding its crew with sunlight as John Paul Jones destroys the ship. The destroyer attempts to target the communications array, but is sunk by drones; Alex, Nagata, and several other sailors barely escape.

The survivors commandeer the decommissioned World War II battleship  with the aid of retired veterans. The floating structure is revealed to be a giant mothership, but Missouri disables the force field while Admiral Shane summons fighter jets from the aircraft carrier . The battleship’s turret carrying the ship’s last shell is disabled, forcing the sailors to carry it to another weapon system. Sam, Mick and Cal stall the aliens at the array, where Mick kills an alien soldier. Alex uses the final shell to destroy the array, rendering the Missouri defenseless, but the mothership’s drones are destroyed by Royal Australian Air Force  Boeing F/A-18 fighter jets which carpet bomb the mothership, eliminating the alien threat.

Alex is promoted to lieutenant commander and presented with a Silver Star and his brother's posthumous Navy Cross. Admiral Shane promises Alex will soon have a ship of his own, while he is also invited to become a Navy SEAL. Alex asks him for Sam’s hand in marriage, and the admiral initially refuses, but invites Alex to lunch.

In a post-credits scene, three teenagers in Scotland find another piece of the alien communications spacecraft, and with the help of an adult manage to open it. The scene ends with the four of them fleeing in terror as an alien crawls out.

Cast
 Brooklyn Decker as Samantha Shane, a physical therapist and Alex's girlfriend.
 Liam Neeson as Admiral Terrance Shane, Commander of the U.S. Pacific Fleet and father of Samantha Shane.
 Hamish Linklater as Cal Zapata, a scientist working on O'ahu.
 Gregory D. Gadson as Lieutenant Colonel Mick Canales, a U.S. Army combat veteran and double amputee.
 Adam Godley as Dr. Nogrady, the scientist leading the Beacon program.
 Peter MacNicol as the U.S. Secretary of Defense
 Jerry Ferrara as Sampson JOOD Strodell
 Stephen Bishop as JPJ OOD
 Josh Pence as Chief Moore
 Rami Malek as Lieutenant Hill
 Louis Lombardi as The Bartender
 Gary Grubbs as USAF Chief of Staff

Production

Battleship was greenlit with a production budget of $150 million but went through a troubled pre-production. Universal at one point considered canceling the film, which would have resulted in a $30 million loss. However, new chairman Adam Fogelson decided the studio would lose less money if they increased the budget of the film instead of outright cancelling it. Filming was set to take place in Australia's Gold Coast in 2010, but changed location due to a lack of Australian government tax incentives and a high estimated budget of $220 million.

Filming took place in the United States on the Hawaiian islands of Maui and Oahu, as well as on the mainland where they had to film a few apartment scenes in Sherman Oaks, California, and they had also filmed a driving scene along with a shootout in Playa del Rey, California. Some scenes were also filmed in Baton Rouge, Louisiana.

Also featured in the film were the real-life guided missile destroyers USS Benfold (DDG-65), USS John Paul Jones (DDG-53), and USS Sampson (DDG-102) all of which are active members of the US Navy Pacific Fleet. A  of the Japan Maritime Self-Defense Force also appeared in the film.

The Science & Entertainment Exchange provided science consultation for the film.

Casting
Jeremy Renner was originally considered for the role of Hopper. In April 2010, it was reported that Taylor Kitsch had been cast as Alex Hopper, Alexander Skarsgård played his brother Stone Hopper, Brooklyn Decker stars as Sam, Hopper's fiancee and Liam Neeson as Admiral Shane, Sam's father and Hopper's superior officer. Barbadian R&B singer Rihanna makes her acting debut in the film, as a sailor. In an interview with GQ, Berg explained how he came up with the idea to cast her. He realized she could act after her appearance on Saturday Night Live. She accepted the role because she wanted "to do something badass" and also because it wasn't a role too big for her to play. Tadanobu Asano also has a role in the film as the commander of a Japanese Kongō-class destroyer. Double amputee U.S. Army Colonel Gregory Gadson, who had never acted before, plays LTC Mick Canales. He was cast after Berg saw a picture of him in National Geographic.

The film marks the reunion between former co-stars Kitsch and Jesse Plemons, who previously worked together on Berg's television series Friday Night Lights. Berg said he loves working with friends and explained he knew how comfortable Kitsch was with Plemons, "I know that he’s really good for Taylor and he makes Taylor better. So, I wrote that whole part for Jesse." He added, "I never thought of it as a Friday Night Lights reunion. I thought of it as protection, bringing a trusted family member in."

U.S. Navy sailors were used as extras in various parts of this film. Sailors from assorted commands in Navy Region Hawaii assisted with line handling to take  in and out of port for a day of shooting in mid 2010. A few months later, the production team put out a casting call for sailors stationed at various sea commands at Naval Station Mayport, Florida to serve as extras.

Music

Due to his success with the Transformers franchise, composer Steve Jablonsky was chosen to score the official soundtrack. The soundtrack features original compositions from Jablonsky and features rock guitarist Tom Morello from Rage Against the Machine. Director Peter Berg stated:

Additional music credits
 Stone Temple Pilots – "Interstate Love Song"
 Billy Squier – "Everybody Wants You"
 Henry Mancini – "The Pink Panther Theme"
 Lucky Clark – "My Lai"
 The Black Keys – "Gold on the Ceiling"
 Citizen Cope – "One Lovely Day"
 Dropkick Murphys – "Hang 'Em High"
 Carl Perkins – "Blue Suede Shoes"
 AC/DC – "Hard as a Rock"
 ZZ Top – "I Gotsta Get Paid"
 Royal Philharmonic Orchestra – "Waltz: On the Beautiful Blue Danube"
 AC/DC – "Thunderstruck"
 Band of Horses – "The Funeral"
 Creedence Clearwater Revival – "Fortunate Son"

Release

The film was originally planned to be released in 2011, but was rescheduled to May 18, 2012, in the United States. The film's world premiere took place in Tokyo on April 3, 2012. The event was attended by director Peter Berg, actors Taylor Kitsch, Brooklyn Decker, Alexander Skarsgård and Rihanna. Later on they initiated a Press Tour visiting Madrid, London and Cartagena de Indias to promote the film.

Reception

Box office
Battleship grossed $65.4 million in the United States and Canada, and $237.6 million in other territories, for a worldwide total of $303 million, against a production budget of $209 million. In May 2012, The Hollywood Reporter estimated that Universal would lose $150 million on the film.

The film opened in several territories on Wednesday, April 11, 2012, five weeks before its North America release, grossing $7.4 million. Through April 13, the film had earned a three-day total of $25 million. By the end of its opening weekend, it earned $55.2 million from 26 markets, ranking second behind the 3D re-release of Titanic. In its second weekend, it topped the box office outside North America, with $60 million. In South Korea, it achieved the highest-grossing opening day for a non-sequel and the third-highest overall ($2.8 million). In comparison to other Hasbro films, Battleship opening in the United Kingdom (£3.76 million) was behind the first Transformers (£8.72 million), but did better than G.I. Joe: The Rise of Cobra (£1.71 million).

In the United States, Battleship grossed $8.8 million on its opening day, with $420,000 from midnight showings. It went on to debut to $25.5 million, finishing in second place behind Marvel's The Avengers.

Critical response
Rotten Tomatoes reports that 33% of 229 critics gave the film a positive review and an average rating of 4.6/10. The site's critics consensus reads: "It may offer energetic escapism for less demanding filmgoers, but Battleship is too loud, poorly written, and formulaic to justify its expense – and a lot less fun than its source material." Metacritic assigned the film a weighted average score of 41 out of 100, based on 39 critics, indicating "mixed or average reviews". Audiences polled by CinemaScore gave the film an average grade of "B" on an A+ to F scale.

Megan Lehmann of The Hollywood Reporter thought that the "impressive visual effects and director Peter Berg's epic set pieces fight against an armada of cinematic clichés and some truly awful dialogue." Empire magazine's Nick de Semlyen felt there was a lack of character development and memorable action shots, and sums up his review of the movie in one word: "Miss."

Many reviews criticized the "based on a board game" concept driving the film, although some, such as Jason Di Rosso from the Australian Broadcasting Corporation's Radio National, claimed the ridiculousness of the setup is "either sheer joy or pure hell – depending on how seriously you take it", while de Semlyen "had to admire [the film's creators] jumping through hoops to engineer a sequence that replicates the board game." Several compared the film to Michael Bay's Transformers film series in terms of quality and cinematic style, with Giles Hardie of The Sydney Morning Herald claiming that the movie "finds the same balance between action-packed imagination and not taking the premise seriously that made Michael Bay's original Transformers such a joyride." Andrew Harrison of Q magazine called the film "crushingly stupid". Film critic Kenneth Turan, in a review written for the Los Angeles Times, also expressed disappointment, criticizing the film's "humanoid aliens", stating that they are "as ungainly as the movie itself, clunking around in awkward, protective suits." He called the content "all very earnest", but added "it's not a whole lot of fun". Peter Travers of Rolling Stone gave the film one out of four stars, and he commented "Battleship is all noise and crashing metal, sinking to the shallows of Michael Bay's Armageddon and then digging to the brain-extinction level of the Transformers trilogy."

Other critics were less harsh for Battleship: Writing for Time, Steven James Snyder was somewhat positive because he had low expectations of the film. He wrote, "The creative team behind this ocean-bound thriller decided to fill the narrative black hole with a few ingredients all but absent from today’s summer tent poles – namely mystery, nostalgia and a healthy dose of humility" and described it as "an unlikely mix of Independence Day, Pearl Harbor, Jurassic Park and The Hunt for Red October". Giving it a B+ grade, Lisa Schwarzbaum of Entertainment Weekly said, "For every line of howler dialogue that should have been sunk, there's a nice little scene in which humans have to make a difficult decision. For every stretch of generic sci-fi-via-CGI moviemaking, there's a welcome bit of wit." The Washington Post gave the film a three-star rating out of four commenting it is "an invigorating blast of cinematic adrenaline". Roger Ebert of the Chicago Sun-Times gave the film 2.5 stars out of 4, praising the climax as "an honest-to-God third act, instead of just settling for nonstop fireballs and explosions, as Bay likes to do. I don't want to spoil it for you. Let's say the Greatest Generation still has the right stuff and leave it at that."

Accolades

Home media
Battleship was released on DVD and Blu-ray on August 20, 2012 in the United Kingdom, and on August 28 in the United States and Canada. Its revenue was $32.4 million. Battleship was released on 4K Blu-Ray on January 17, 2017. It received a novelization written by Peter David.

Video game
A video game based on the film, titled Battleship, was released on May 15, 2012 to coincide with the film's international release. The game was published by Activision and developed by Double Helix Games for PlayStation 3, Wii, and Xbox 360, and developed by Magic Pockets for Nintendo 3DS and Nintendo DS.

Board game
Hasbro released several new editions of the classic board game, including an update to the regular fleet-vs.-fleet game and a "movie edition", featuring the alien vessels and a card-based play mode.

See also
 American Warships, the mockbuster film released at the same time and featuring one of USS Missouris sister ships, .
Battle: Los Angeles, a 2011 film portraying an alien force in direct combat with the U.S. military.

References

External links

 
 
 
 
 
 
 
 
 

2012 films
2012 science fiction action films
2010s war films
American science fiction action films
American science fiction adventure films
American science fiction war films
2010s English-language films
Alien invasions in films
Films about extraterrestrial life
Films about naval warfare
Films about the United States Navy
Japan Self-Defense Forces in fiction
Films based on games
Films based on Hasbro toys
Films directed by Peter Berg
Films produced by Peter Berg
Films produced by Scott Stuber
Films scored by Steve Jablonsky
Films set in 2005
Films set in 2006
Films set in 2012
Films set in Hawaii
Films set in Hong Kong
Films set in London
Films set in New York City
Films set in Scotland
Films set in Tokyo
Films set in the Pacific Ocean
Films set in the White House
Films set in Washington, D.C.
Films set on ships
Films set on aircraft carriers
Films shot in Hawaii
Films shot in Honolulu
Films shot in Los Angeles
Films shot in Louisiana
IMAX films
Military science fiction films
Universal Pictures films
War adventure films
Golden Raspberry Award winning films
Films about old age
Films produced by Brian Goldner
2010s American films